Charles E. Scott (born 1935) is an American philosopher and Distinguished Professor of Philosophy Emeritus and Research Professor of Philosophy at Vanderbilt University. Previously, he was Edwin Erle Sparks Professor of Philosophy at Penn State University.

Books
 Living With Indifference, Indiana University Press, May 2007
 The Lives of Things, Indiana University Press, 2002
 The Time of Memory, SUNY Press, 1999
 On the Advantages and Disadvantages of Ethics and Politics, Indiana University Press, 1996
 The Question of Ethics, Indiana University Press, 1990
 The Language of Difference, Humanities International Press, 1987
 Boundaries in Mind: A Study of Immediate Awareness Based in Psychotherapy, Crossroad Publishing Co., 1982

References

20th-century American philosophers
Philosophy academics
1935 births
Living people
Vanderbilt University faculty
Yale University alumni
Pennsylvania State University faculty
Heidegger scholars
Nietzsche scholars
Derrida scholars
Foucault scholars